Wahlenbergia preissii is a small herbaceous plant in the family Campanulaceae native to Western Australia.

It blooms between September and November producing blue-pink-white flowers.

The species is found among granite outcrops in the Mid West, Goldfields-Esperance, Wheatbelt and South West regions of Western Australia where it grows in sandy-loamy soils.

Taxonomy
It was first described in 1848 by the Dutch botanist Willem Hendrik de Vriese.

References

preissii
Eudicots of Western Australia
Plants described in 1848
Taxa named by Willem Hendrik de Vriese
Endemic flora of Western Australia